"91's" is a song by French rap duo PNL. It was released on 10 August 2018 as the second single from their third studio album Deux frères. It debuted at number one on the French SNEP singles chart.

Charts

Certifications

References 

2018 singles
2018 songs
French-language songs
PNL (rap duo) songs
SNEP Top Singles number-one singles